Ludovic Zanoni (26 June 1935 – 27 October 2021) was a Romanian cyclist. He was born in Arad, his profession was as an electrician.

He competed at the 1960 Summer Olympics in the 100 km team time trial and finished in sixth place. He was second in the Tour of Romania in 1955 and 1958.

References 

1935 births
2021 deaths
Cyclists at the 1960 Summer Olympics
Olympic cyclists of Romania
Sportspeople from Arad, Romania
Romanian male cyclists
 electricians